Manitoba is the fifth most populous province in Canada with 1,342,153 residents as of 2021 and is the sixth largest in land area at . These municipalities provide local government services to their residents.

A municipality in Manitoba is "a municipality that is continued or formed under" the Municipal Act, which was enacted in 1996. Municipalities that can be formed under this legislation include urban municipalities (cities, towns and villages) and rural municipalities. The Local Government Districts Act, enacted in 1987, allows the formation of local government districts as another municipality type. Of Manitoba's 137 municipalities, 37 of them are urban municipalities (10 cities, 25 towns and 2 villages), 98 are rural municipalities and 2 are local government districts. The Municipal Act and the Local Government Districts Act stipulate governance of these municipalities. Additional charters or acts are in place specifically for the cities of Brandon, Flin Flon, Portage la Prairie, Thompson and Winnipeg, the towns of Morris and Winnipeg Beach, and the rural municipalities of Kelsey, St. Andrews and Victoria Beach. The Municipal Act, the Local Government Districts Act, and all these additional acts and charters were enacted at the provincial level by the Lieutenant Governor of Manitoba on the advice and consent of the Legislative Assembly of Manitoba. The Government of Manitoba's Department of Municipal Relations responsible for providing provincial services to  municipalities.

Over half of Manitoba's population resides in the City of Winnipeg, the provincial capital, with a population with 749,607. The City of Brandon is the province's second most populous municipality with 51,313 residents. Manitoba's smallest municipality by population is the Local Government District of Mystery Lake with 0 residents.

Manitoba's first municipality was the RM of Springfield (originally Springfield-Sunnyside). It was incorporated on September 27, 1873. Winnipeg was incorporated as a city a few weeks later on November 8, 1873.

Urban municipalities 

Manitoba's Municipal Act, enacted in 1996, defines an urban municipality as an incorporated "area with at least 1,000 residents and a population density of at least 400 residents per square kilometre." An urban municipality, upon formation, may be named a "city", "town", "village" or "urban municipality", although there is a minimum 7,500 population requirement that limits the naming of cities.

Combined, Manitoba has 37 urban municipalities comprising 10 cities, 25 towns and 2 villages. These totals represent  of Manitoba's population but only  of its land area.

Of Manitoba's 37 urban municipalities, 6 have populations less than the current minimum population requirement of 1,000 and 20 have less than the current minimum density requirement of 400 residents per square kilometre. All of these were incorporated as urban municipalities prior to the Municipal Act being enacted in 1996.

Cities 

In Manitoba, a city is a type of urban municipality. The Municipal Act stipulates that an urban municipality can only be named a city if it has a minimum population of 7,500 residents.

Manitoba has 10 cities that had a cumulative population of 892,517 in the 2021 census. These 10 cities include Flin Flon, of which a small portion is located within the neighbouring province of Saskatchewan. The province's largest and smallest cities by population are Winnipeg and the Manitoba portion of Flin Flon with populations of 749,607 and 4,940 respectively. Manitoba's newest city is Morden, which changed from a town to a city on August 24, 2012.

Towns 

In Manitoba, an urban municipality may be named a town upon formation. Other than the requirements to incorporate as an urban municipality (1,000 residents and 400 people/km2), the Municipal Act has no minimum population threshold to limit the naming of them as towns. A town can alternately be named a village or urban municipality under the Municipal Act or a city if it has a minimum population of 7,500.

Manitoba has 25 towns that had a cumulative population of 60,963 in the 2021 census. The province's largest and smallest towns by population are Niverville and Grand Rapids with populations of 5,947 and 213 respectively.

Villages 

In Manitoba, an urban municipality may be named a village upon formation. Other than the minimum requirements to incorporate as an urban municipality (1,000 residents and 400 people/km2), the Municipal Act has no minimum population threshold to limit the naming of them as villages. A village can alternately be named a town or urban municipality under the Municipal Act or a city if it has a minimum population of 7,500.

Manitoba has 2 villages that had a cumulative population of 2,294 in the 2021 census. These are St-Pierre-Jolys and Dunnottar with populations of 1,305 and 989 respectively.

List of urban municipalities

Rural municipalities 

Manitoba's Municipal Act, enacted in 1987, defines rural municipality (RM) as an incorporated "area with at least 1,000 residents and a population density of less than 400 residents per square kilometre." Manitoba has 98 rural municipalities that had a cumulative population of 313,064 in the 2021 census. The province's largest and smallest rural municipalities by population are the Hanover and the Ethelbert with populations of 17,216 and 648 respectively.

Of Manitoba's 98 rural municipalities, 8 have populations less than the current minimum population requirement of 1,000. All of these were either incorporated as rural municipalities prior to the Municipal Act being enacted in 1996 or formed by the amalgamation of two or more municipalities incorporated prior to 1996. Many municipalities previously under the minimum population were required to amalgamate by the Government of Manitoba's Municipal Amalgamations Act enacted in 2013. However, the legislation excluded "resort municipalities" like Victoria Beach and the government allowed some of the new amalgamated municipalities to form with a combined population under 1,000.

Local government districts 
Manitoba's Local Government Districts Act, enacted in 1987, defines a local government district (LGD) as "an area or areas that is or are wholly or partly in unorganized territory or in a disorganized municipality" with inhabitants. LGDs are incorporated by Manitoba's Lieutenant Governor in Council through passage of a regulation.

Manitoba has two LGDs: Mystery Lake and Pinawa. For municipal statistical purposes, Mystery Lake is considered a rural municipality while Pinawa is considered an urban municipality.

See also 

Amalgamation of Winnipeg
List of census agglomerations in Manitoba
List of communities in Manitoba by population
Manitoba municipal amalgamations, 2015

Notes

References

External links 
Association of Manitoba Municipalities
Manitoba Local Government

Municipalities